Robbie Montgomery (born June 16, 1940) is an American singer and restaurateur. She is noted for being one of the original Ikettes in the Ike & Tina Turner Revue in the 1960s. After her tenure as an Ikette, she was a member of the Mirettes, and then became a "Night Tripper" for Dr. John. In the 1970s, Montgomery was a backing vocalist for acts such as Stevie Wonder, Barbra Streisand, the Rolling Stones, and Joe Cocker. She later created the Sweetie Pie's franchise, and starred in the award-winning reality series Welcome to Sweetie Pie's.

Early life 
Montgomery was born on June 16, 1940, in Columbus, Mississippi, to Ora Gray and James Montgomery. They lived with her great grandmother Miss Pathenia, who was an American Indian. When she was six years old, her family moved to St. Louis, Missouri. She grew up in the Pruitt-Igoe projects as the oldest of nine siblings. Her siblings are James, Walter, Robert, George, Everett, Linda and Janice. Montgomery was raised a Baptist but is now a Methodist. She sang in the church choir, attended Curtis Elementary School and graduated from Pruitt High School.

Music career 

Montgomery and two neighborhood friends Frances Hodges and Sandra Harding, started a doo-wop singing group called the Chordettes, which evolved into the Rhythmettes, and they started appearing in talent shows. A local singer named Art Lassiter hired them as backup singers and they became the Artettes. Lassiter sang with bandleader Ike Turner and his Kings of Rhythm. Turner wrote a song, "A Fool in Love," for Lassiter. When Art Lassiter didn't show up for a recording session at Technisonic Studios in March 1960, Turner took the Artettes and had them accompany his backup vocalist Little Ann (Tina Turner) on the track.

"A Fool In Love," was released in July 1960 on Sue Records and became a hit, peaking at No. 27 on the Billboard Hot 100 and No. 2 on the Billboard Hot R&B Sides. Turner formed the Ike & Tina Turner Revue, but with a new group of backup singers: Delores Johnson, Eloise Hester, and Jo Armstead. Montgomery was pregnant and unable to tour. After having her baby in 1961, Montogmery toured with blues musician Earl Hooker before she returned to Ike & Tina Turner. During her hiatus she sang with the group Benny Sharp & the New Breed who had another female vocalist named Jessie Smith. Montgomery and Smith along with Venetta Fields (a gospel singer from Buffalo) formed the first official incarnation of The Ikettes. In 1962, Montgomery released her first single,"Crazy In Love" / "Pee Wee" on Turner's Teena Records label.

The Ike & Tina Turner Revue performed a grueling schedule of one-nighters on the Chitlin Circuit in the segregated south, and recorded constantly, but Montgomery recalled those timed fondly. "We had good times. We would gamble, sing, dance, all the way to the next gig," she told St. Louis Magazine. In 1962, Turner relocated the Ike & Tina Turner Revue to California. In 1965, the Ikettes released two of their biggest hits on Modern Records, "Peaches 'N' Cream" (Pop No. 36, R&B No. 28) and "I'm So Thankful" (Pop No. 74, R&B No. 12). As an Ikette, Montogmery performed on the television shows American Bandstand, Hollywood A Go-Go, and Shindig!.

Montgomery, Smith and Fields left the Ike & Tina Turner Revue in 1965. After trying unsuccessfully to continue using the name the Ikettes under management of Tina Turner's sister, Alline Bullock, they changed their name to the Mirettes after their new label Mirwood Records. Their single release did not chart and they later signed with Revue Records. In 1968, they had success with the single "In the Midnight Hour" (Pop No. 45, R&B No. 18). They sang on The Lost Man soundtrack produced by Quincy Jones in 1969.

Montgomery eventually left the Mirettes to join Dr. John as a "Night Tripper" in the 1970's. She provided backing vocals for variety of acts, including Barbra Streisand, Debbie Reynolds, Joe Cocker and Stevie Wonder. In the 1970's she was diagnosed with sarcoidosis which required lung surgery and derailed her singing career.

In 1986 and 1987, Montgomery toured Europe with former members of the Kings of Rhythm, including Jimmy Hinds, Clayton Love, Billy Gayles, Erskine Oglesby, Stacy Johnson and Oliver Sain, as part of the St. Louis Kings of Rhythm. The band was officially appointed as ambassadors for the City of St. Louis.

In 2018, Montgomery released her debut album, Miss Robbie's What They Call Me, which was her first release in 40 years. The album includes songs that are mixture of soul, blues and country. Montgomery worked on the project with St. Louis-based producer andengineer Carl Nappa.

Sweetie Pie's 
After Montgomery's lung collapsed, which prevented her singing, she moved back to St. Louis from California and became a dialysis technician. Eventually she took her mother's soul food recipes, and created the soul food restaurant, Sweetie Pie's, run by herself and her family. The first restaurant, in Dellwood, Missouri, opened in 1996. Montgomery hires men out of prison looking for jobs to work in her restaurant.

Welcome to Sweetie Pies, a reality show which focused on Montgomery running her soul food restaurants, premiered on OWN on October 15, 2011.

In 2015, Montgomery was featured in the book The People's Place: Soul Food Restaurants and Reminiscences from the Civil Rights Era to Today. Montgomery told author Dave Hoekstra that managing her own restaurant gave her new appreciation for her former boss Ike Turner. "Back then we all thought he was mean. You had to rehearse. He had his rules. You couldn't have runs in your stockings. But now that I am running a business I know exactly where he was coming from." Before Turner died in 2007, he visited Sweetie Pie's and tipped Montgomery fifty-dollars.

In 2016, Montgomery sued her son Tim Norman for stealing money and violating her Sweetie Pie’s trademark to open competing restaurants,and, in 2017, Montgomery filed a motion to enforce a settlement agreement.

In January 2020, Sweetie Pie's opened a new location in Jackson, Mississippi. Montgomery and Bobby Rush performed at the grand opening.

Accolades 
In the 1980s, Mayor Vincent Schoemehl appointed the St. Louis Kings of Rhythm, which included Montgomery, ambassadors for the City of St. Louis.

In 2010, George Lombardi, the director of the Missouri Department of Corrections, presented Montgomery with a plaque honoring her for her willingness to help ex-offenders.

Welcome to Sweetie Pie's won the NAACP Image Award for Best Reality Series in both 2013 and 2016.

Personal life 
Montgomery had a son, Andre Montgomery (1961 – 1995), with Art Lassiter. Her grandson, Andre Montgomery Jr. (1994-2016), was featured on her show and was murdered in a shooting in 2016.

Montgomery's son James Timothy Norman was born in 1979. He managed the Sweetie Pie's restaurant on Manchester Avenue in St. Louis. In 2018, Norman was arrested for an incident in 2017 where he was accused of punching his ex-restaurant employee. On August 18, 2020, Norman was arrested in Mississippi and charged for his alleged role in a murder-for-hire plot that resulted in the death of Andre Jr. in 2016. It was reported that Norman, who is facing federal charges and was proven to be the sole beneficiary to an insurance policy on Andre, recruited a Memphis exotic dancer named Terica Ellis, and others to assist in the murder plot. Ellis and two other co-conspirators, Travell Anthony Hill and Waiel Rebhi Yaghnam, would later plead guilty to conspiracy to commit murder. Norman's murder trial began on September 6, 2022. Norman was found guilty on September 16, 2022 after the jury deliberated for about 17 hours. On March 2, 2023, he received a life sentence.

Discography

Singles 
 1963: "Crazy In Love" / "Pee Wee" (Teena 1701)

Albums 
 2018: Miss Robbie's What They Call Me

Featured as an Ikette/Mirette 
 1964: Ike & Tina Turner Revue Live (Kent Records)
 1965: Live! The Ike & Tina Turner Show (Warner Bros Records)
 1965: Fine Fine Fine (Stateside Records)
 1967: The Ike & Tina Turner Show (Vol. 2) (Loma Records)
 1966: Soul The Hits (Modern Records)
 1968: In The Midnight Hour (Revue Records)
 1969: Whirlpool (Uni Records)
 1987: Fine Fine Fine (Kent Records)
1987: St. Louis Kings Of Rhythm (Timeless Records)
 2004: The Bad Man: Rare & Unreissued Ike Turner Produced Recordings 1962–1965 (Night Train International)
 2007: Can't Sit Down... 'Cos It Feels So Good: The Complete Modern Recordings (Kent Records)

Backing vocal credits 
 1971: New York City (You're a Woman) – Al Kooper 
1972: Souvenirs – Alex Harvey
1972: Bad But Not Evil – Marjoe
 1972: Dr. John's Gumbo – Dr. John
 1973: In the Right Place – Dr. John
 1973: Triumvirate – Mike Bloomfield, John Hammond Jr. and Dr. John
1973: Truth – King Hannibal
1973: Sharon Cash – Sharon Cash
1973: Brenda Patterson – Brenda Patterson
 1973: These Foolish Things – Bryan Ferry
1974: Compartments – José Feliciano
1974: White Lady – Badger
 1974: Desitively Bonnaroo – Dr. John
1974: Browning Bryant – Browning Bryant
 1975: Hollywood Be Thy Name – Dr. John
 1975: Home Plate – Bonnie Raitt
1976: Feelin' Free – Hap Palmer
 1977: A Period of Transition – Van Morrison
1988: Have Mercy – Eddie Kirkland
2006: Roots, Blues & Jazz – Bonnie Bramlett

Books 
 Sweetie Pie's Cookbook: Soulful Southern Recipes, from My Family to Yours (2015)

References

External links 

 Sweetie Pie's Restaurant
 Robbie Montgomery at AllMusic
 Welcome to Sweetie Pie's at OWN

1940 births
Living people
People from Columbus, Mississippi
Singers from Missouri
American rhythm and blues singers
American soul singers
Ike & Tina Turner members
American restaurateurs
Women restaurateurs
African-American women singers
20th-century African-American women singers
Businesspeople from St. Louis
People with sarcoidosis